Županjac may refer to:

 Tomislavgrad, a town in Bosnia and Herzegovina
 Županjac, a village in Serbia